Wilson Elser Moskowitz Edelman & Dicker, (known as Wilson Elser), is a law firm with over 1,000 attorneys in 41 offices throughout the United States and one in London.

History
The predecessor firm to what is known today as Wilson Elser started back in 1944 when Max Edelman hired Sol Kroll into his [then] small practice.  Over the decades the Kroll and Edelman building what became a pioneer for multi-state, later international, law-firms, and as it grew, came to be known as Kroll, Edelman, Elser, & Wilson by the 1970s. 

After Kroll departed, Wilson Elser was established in 1978 by attorneys Thomas Wilson, Sr., John Elser and Max Edelman. While the firm's heritage is in the area of insurance defense, it has increasingly expanded into the corporate and transactional realms and now represents clients in a wide range of legal services.

Recognition
Wilson Elser ranks among the top 200 law firms identified by The American Lawyer and 53rd in The National Law Journal's survey of the nation's largest law firms. Wilson Elser ranks 36th in Law360’s 100 Best Law Firms for Female Attorneys and ranked 9th on the Law360 list of The 10 Best BigLaw Firms for Female Attorneys.

References

External links
Official Website
Criminal Defense Lawyer
Medical Malpractice Lawyer

Law firms based in New York City
Law firms established in 1978